Georg Kaibel (30 October 1849 – 12 October 1901) was a German classical philologist born in Lübeck. He was a leading authority of Greek epigraphy and epigrammatics

He studied classical philology at the Universities of Göttingen and Bonn. At Bonn he was a pupil of Hermann Usener and Franz Bücheler. In 1872–74 he was a member of the German Archaeological Institute in Rome, where he became a close associate of Theodor Mommsen and Ulrich von Wilamowitz-Moellendorff. Afterwards, he taught classes in Elberfeld and at the Askanische Oberschule in Berlin.

In 1879 he became an associate professor of classical philology at the University of Breslau, followed by professorships at Rostock (1882), Greifswald (1883) and Strasbourg (1886). In 1897 he returned to Göttingen, where he was elected a full member of the Göttingen Academy of Sciences. 

Kaibel published several editions of works from the Second Sophistic era, as well as highly regarded editions of Sophocles' Electra and Antigone. He was editor of the journal "Hermes" (1882 to 1901), and contributed numerous articles on Greek comedy to the first four volumes of Georg Wissowa's Realencyclopädie der Classischen Altertumswissenschaft (1894–1901).

Selected publications 
 Epigrammata Graeca ex lapidibus conlecta, (1878)
 Supplementum epigrammatum Graecorum ex lapidibus conlectorum, (1879)
 Dionysios von Halikarnassos, (1885)
 Deipnosophistai of Athenaeus of Naucratis (in Bibliotheca Teubneriana, 1887–90)
 Poetarum Comicorum Graecorum Fragmenta (1890)
 Inscriptiones Italiae et Siciliae (IG XIV, 1890)
 Athenaiôn Politeia of Aristotle   (Volume 1 & 2 1891, Volume 3 1898), with Ulrich von Wilamowitz-Moellendorff
 Protreptikos of Galen, (1894)
 Elektra of Sophocles, (1896)
 Antigone of Sophocles, (1897)
 Phrynichos, (1899)
 Cassius Longinus, (1899)

References

Sources 
 This article is based on a translation of an equivalent article at the German Wikipedia, its source being listed as NDB/ADB Deutsche Biographie.

External links 
 Ancient Greek OCR of Deipnosophistai von Athenaios von Naukratis at the Lace collection of Mount Allison University: vol. 1, vol. 2  and vol. 3.
 Digital Athenaeus
 Casaubon-Kaibel Reference Converter

German classical philologists
Writers from Lübeck
Academic staff of the University of Breslau
Academic staff of the University of Rostock
Academic staff of the University of Strasbourg
Academic staff of the University of Greifswald
Academic staff of the University of Göttingen
1901 deaths
1849 births